Periploca nigra, the juniper twig girdler, is a moth in the family Cosmopterigidae. It was described by Ronald W. Hodges in 1962. It is found in the United States, where it has been recorded from New York to Virginia and from Louisiana to California.

References

Moths described in 1962
Chrysopeleiinae
Taxa named by Ronald W. Hodges
Moths of North America